San Salvador BC is a basketball club based in San Salvador, El Salvador.

The club was founded in February 2018, in order for the country of El Salvador to be represented in the 2018 FIBA Americas League. El Salvador had a 0–3 record in the group phase, as it was eliminated.

References

Basketball teams in El Salvador
Basketball teams established in 2018